Barbara G. Taylor  (born 1950) is a Canadian-born historian based in the United Kingdom, specialising in the Enlightenment, gender studies and the history of subjectivity. She is Professor of Humanities at Queen Mary, University of London.

She was born and raised in Western Canada. In 1971, she was awarded her first degree in political thought from the University of Saskatchewan. She then moved to London, where she gained an MSc in the same subject at the London School of Economics, followed by a PhD in history at the University of Sussex. She taught history at the University of East London from 1993 until 2012 and then moved to Queen Mary, University of London, as joint professor of the schools of English & Drama, and History.

She has received research grants and fellowships from the Leverhulme Trust, the Nuffield Foundation, the Guggenheim Foundation (1996), the Social Sciences and Humanities Research Council, and the Wellcome Trust.

Taylor has written a biography of Mary Wollstonecraft, the early English feminist and republican, and continues to speak on her life, for example in 2009 at Newington Green Unitarian Church as part of the celebrations of the 250th anniversary of Wollstonecraft's birth.

With the psychologist Adam Phillips, Taylor is the co-author of On Kindness (2009).
Taylor's memoir The Last Asylum: A Memoir of Madness in Our Times, describing her years at Friern Hospital, was published in 2014.
It was a finalist for the 2015 RBC Taylor Prize.

References

External links
Barbara Taylor profile at the Queen Mary college of the University of London

1950 births
Academics of Queen Mary University of London
British biographers
British women academics
Canadian women academics
Fellows of the Royal Historical Society
Gender studies academics
Living people
Mary Wollstonecraft scholars
University of Saskatchewan alumni
Deutscher Memorial Prize winners